The Rafael Fernández government was the first regional government of Asturias led by President Rafael Fernández.

Investiture

Composition

References

Cabinets of Asturias
Cabinets established in 1982